DCG-IV is a research drug which acts as a group-selective agonist for the group II metabotropic glutamate receptors (mGluR2/3). It has potent neuroprotective and anticonvulsant effects in animal studies, as well as showing anti-Parkinsonian effects, but also impairs the formation of memories.

References

Anticonvulsants
Amino acids
Tricarboxylic acids
Cyclopropanes
MGlu2 receptor agonists
MGlu3 receptor agonists